Tahalra volcanic field is a volcanic field in Algeria. It consists of a Miocene lava plateau and a number of Pliocene to Holocene age individual vents, including cinder cones.

Geography and geomorphology 

Tamanrasset lies east-northeast from the field. Cinder cones, lava domes, lava flows and maars form the field, which covers a surface of  elongated west to east.

Geology 

Tahalra is part of a province of volcanic fields in the Hoggar, which has been active since the Mesozoic. Seismic tomography has shown the existence of low-velocity mantle beneath the Tahalra and Atakor volcanic fields, sign of the presence of recent volcanism. 

The basement beneath the field consists of rocks of Precambrian age, mostly metamorphic rocks and plutons which are part of a mobile belt at the margin of the West African Craton. Parts of the basement are covered with Paleozoic rocks.

The field has erupted basalt, basanite, rhyolite and trachyte. They contain amphibole, clinopyroxene, magnetite and olivine phenocrysts. Patterns in trace element composition and isotope ratios imply that the magmas either developed from variable starting material or from metasomatized mantle.

Eruptive history 

Eruptions continued in the Pliocene and the Pleistocene, forming many individual vents. Maars and cones in the northern part of the field are of Pleistocene and Holocene age (Paleolithic to Neolithic).

References

Sources 

 

Holocene volcanoes
Volcanoes of Algeria
Volcanic fields